Stomatium alboroseum is a species of succulent plant in the family Aizoaceae, native to the Cape Provinces of South Africa. Under its synonym Stomatium niveum it has gained the Royal Horticultural Society's Award of Garden Merit.

References

alboroseum
Endemic flora of South Africa
Flora of the Cape Provinces
Plants described in 1931
Taxa named by Louisa Bolus